Montenegrin municipal elections were held in all 21 municipalities, between April 2004 and October 2006. It resulted in the decisive victory of the ruling Coalition for European Montenegro in 18 out of 21 municipalities, where he has secured a majority, on its own or in a coalition with national minority parties.

Results

Podgorica

The local government was formed after an agreement between ruling Coalition for European Podgorica (composed by Democratic Party of Socialists, the Liberal Party and Bosniak Party), which was a relative winner of the election and Social Democratic Party which ran independently. Current mayor Miomir Mugoša (DPS) has been voted a new four-year mandate.

Herceg Novi 
17,039 or 68.4% of eligible voters voted. 16,649 of the votes are valid and 390 invalid.

Tivat 
The turnout was 65.2% or 7,062. There were 6,938 valid and 124 invalid votes.

Kotor

Results in rest of municipalities
In seventeen other municipalities ruling Coalition for European Montenegro (DPS, SDP, LP and BS) stay in power in most municipalities. It held an absolute majority in Bar, Budva, Žabljak, Bijelo Polje, Danilovgrad, Šavnik, Mojkovac, Kolašin, Plav, Rožaje, Nikšić, Cetinje, Andrijevica and Berane. The opposition won only in Plužine, where the local SNP won absolute power, and in Pljevlja where local government was formed by joint opposition list.

References

2008-10
2008 elections in Europe
2008 in Montenegro